Canada Games Stadium is a multi-purpose, fully lit stadium in Saint John, New Brunswick. It was built on the campus of UNB Saint John for the 1985 Canada Summer Games and has a seating capacity of 5,000 spectators. It hosts the UNB Saint John Seawolves men's and women's soccer teams, and football team.

Canada Games Stadium features a 400m synthetic Tartan track, as well as separate areas for long jump/triple jump, high jump, pole vault, discus, hammer, shot put, and javelin. Inside the track is a synthetic turf soccer/football field.

History
In 2009 the stadium received $3.6 million in upgrades, including resurfacing the track, placing synthetic turf on the infield, the creation of an area for throwing events, grand stand renovations, infield lighting installation, a scoreboard, security lighting and perimeter fencing, and a new storage area.

Besides hosting university and minor sports, the Canada Games Stadium has hosted national track & field events; international soccer matches (including matches during the 1987 FIFA U-16 World Championship), and two CFL pre-season football games (with temporary seating added) in 1986 and 1987. 

In 2012, the stadium hosted the NCCWMA & CMA Masters Track & Field Championships. The University of New Brunswick, Saint John hosted the 2013 CCAA Men's National Soccer Championships.

References

External links
 Fitness & Recreation at UNBSJ
 UNBSJ Map

Soccer venues in New Brunswick
Canadian football venues
Athletics (track and field) venues in Canada
Multi-purpose stadiums in Canada 
Sports venues in New Brunswick
Buildings and structures in Saint John, New Brunswick
Sport in Saint John, New Brunswick
Canada Games Stadium
Sports venues completed in 1985
1985 establishments in New Brunswick